The tetradrachm was a large silver coin that originated in Ancient Greece. It was nominally equivalent to four drachmae. Over time the tetradrachm effectively became the standard coin of the Antiquity, spreading well beyond the borders of the Greek World. As a result, tetradrachms were minted in vast quantities by various polities in many weight and fineness standards, though the Athens-derived Attic standard of about 17.2 grams was the most common.

Because of their large size, tetradrachms were often used by various states or rulers to advertise themselves or to deliver political messages. Popularity of the tetradrachm outlived the political independence of the Greeks and it remained in wide circulation in the Mediterranean up until Crisis of the Third Century, while debased varieties persisted in India and Central Asia into early Middle Ages.  

Due to their often high artistic level tetradrachms are eagerly collected in modern times, and well-preserved or rare specimens can reach considerable prices.

In Athens

In Athens it replaced the earlier "heraldic" type of didrachms and it was in wide circulation from c. 510 to c. 38 BC. 
The transition from didrachms to tetradrachms occurred during c. 525–510 BC; the abandonment of the "heraldic"-type didrachms and the Archaic tetradrachms (early "owls") of the polis of Athens apparently took place shortly after the Battle of Salamis, 480 BC. This transition is supported by the discovery of contemporary coin hoards, and more particularly of a coin hoard found on the Acropolis in 1886. 

The Athenian tetradrachme was widely used in transactions throughout the ancient Greek world, including in cities politically unfriendly to Athens. Athens had silver mines in state ownership, which provided the bullion. Most well known were the silver mines of Laurium in Athenian countryside. The Athenian tetradrachm was stamped with the head of Athena on the obverse, and on the reverse the image of the owl of Athena, the iconographic symbol of the Athenian polis, with a sprig of olive and a crescent for the moon. The design was kept essentially unchanged for over two centuries, by which time it had become stylistically archaic. To differentiate their currency from the rival coinage of Aegina using the Aeginetic stater of about 12.3 grams, Athens minted its tetradrachm based on the "Attic" standard of 4.3 grams per drachma. The vast number of "owls-tetradrachms" available those days mainly from the silver mines of Laurium financed the several achievements of Athens, such as the reconstruction of the Acropolis and building the Parthenon, as well as many wars, including the Peloponnesian War.

In other polities

The tetradrachm's use as a currency was soon adopted by many other city-states of the ancient Greece, Asia Minor, Magna Grecia and other Greek colonial cities throughout the Mediterranean Sea. With the armies of Alexander the Great it spread to other Greek-influenced areas of Asia.

Tetradrachms were common as trade coins.

See also
Coin
Coin in the fish's mouth
List of historical currencies
Stater

References

External links

 Pictures of Athenian tetradrachms (archive)
Tetradrachms from Sicily, Syracuse - The Demareteion Tetradrachm

Coins of ancient Greece
Coins in the Bible